Hellinsia nodipes is a moth of the family Pterophoridae. It is found in Mexico, Colombia, Venezuela, Costa Rica and Ecuador.

References

Moths described in 1877
nodipes
Moths of North America
Moths of South America